David Stewart Farm, also known as Rock Valley Farm, is a historic house and farm located near Triadelphia, Ohio County, West Virginia. The main house was built about 1812, and is a two-story sandstone dwelling.  It is a rectangular, single pile, center-hall structure.  Also on the property are a
sandstone spring house with workshop above, corncrib, washhouse, and old barn.

It was listed on the National Register of Historic Places in 1979.

References

Houses on the National Register of Historic Places in West Virginia
Houses completed in 1812
Houses in Ohio County, West Virginia
National Register of Historic Places in Ohio County, West Virginia
Farms on the National Register of Historic Places in West Virginia